Climbing fig is a common name for several plants in the genus Ficus and may refer to:

Ficus pantoniana, a vine from Australia
Ficus pumila, a vine from East Asia